Mohammed ben Mohammed Alami (1932–1993) was a Moroccan poet. He belongs to the generation of Moroccan poets who published their writings in magazines and newspapers. Much later, his work was published in collections of his poetry.

Bibliography
 Alami, Muhammad Ben Muhammad, Dîwân Muh:ammad bin Muh:ammad al-`Alamî Rabat: Mat:ba`a Fîdbrânt, 1999. Abstract: (Poemario de Muhammad Ben Muhammad al-Alami)
Alami, Muhammad Ben Muhammad, Dîwân Muh:ammad bin Muh:ammad al-`Alamî: Nafh:ât wa ishrâqât Rabat: 2002. Abstract: (Poemario de Muhammad Ben Muhammad Alami, soplidos y erradicaciones).

External links
Literatura Marroqui contemporanea  (retrieved August 25, 2008)

20th-century Moroccan poets
1932 births
1993 deaths